Megachile rotundiventris is a species of bee in the family Megachilidae. It was described by Perris in 1852.

References

Rotundiventris
Insects described in 1852